The Azalea Saberwing, named for the species of hummingbird, is an American amateur-built aircraft, designed and produced by Azalea Aviation of Adel, Georgia, introduced at Sun 'n Fun in 2015. The aircraft is supplied as a kit for amateur construction.

Design and development
The Saberwing features a cantilever low-wing, a two-seats-in-side-by-side configuration enclosed cockpit under a bubble canopy, fixed conventional landing gear or optionally tricycle landing gear, with wheel pants and a single engine in tractor configuration.

The aircraft is made from a composite-foam sandwich with the wing spars and wing ribs made from a wood-composite sandwich. The design has been optimized for a low parts-count to simplify construction. The standard engine used is the in-house developed  Spyder Corvair automotive conversion four-stroke powerplant.

The manufacturer estimates that building the aircraft from the supplied kit requires 500-1,000 hours of labor at a total completion cost of US$40,000-50,000.

Operational history
Reviewers Roy Beisswenger and Marino Boric described the design in a 2015 review as "sleek" and "elegant".

By September 2020, four examples had been registered in the United States with the Federal Aviation Administration.

Specifications (Saberwing)

See also
List of aerobatic aircraft

References

External links

Photo of the prototype Saberwing

Saberwing
2010s United States sport aircraft
Single-engined tractor aircraft
Low-wing aircraft
Homebuilt aircraft